Haman Sadjo (born 28 November 1984, in Ngaoundere) is a Cameroonian footballer who last played for Al-Merrikh in the Sudan Premier League.

International
He won his first cap for Cameroon national football team in the 2010 World Cup Qualification match against Tanzania on 21 June 2008.

External links
 FC Vaduz profile 
 

Living people
1984 births
People from Ngaoundéré
Cameroonian footballers
Association football defenders
Cameroon international footballers
Coton Sport FC de Garoua players
Sahel FC players
Cameroonian expatriate footballers
Expatriate footballers in Morocco
Association Salé players
Cameroonian expatriate sportspeople in Morocco
Expatriate footballers in Hungary
Diósgyőri VTK players
Cameroonian expatriate sportspeople in Hungary
Újpest FC players
Expatriate footballers in Liechtenstein
FC Vaduz players
Cameroonian expatriate sportspeople in Liechtenstein
Budapest Honvéd FC players
Szigetszentmiklósi TK footballers
Kazakhstan Premier League players
FC Akzhayik players